Transcriptional repressor CTCFL also known as BORIS (Brother of Regulator of Imprinted Sites) is a protein that in humans is encoded by the CTCFL gene.

Function 

CCCTC-binding factor (CTCF), an 11-zinc finger factor involved in gene regulation, utilizes different zinc fingers to bind varying DNA target sites. CTCF forms methylation-sensitive insulators that regulate X-chromosome inactivation. Transcriptional repressor CTCFL (this protein) is a paralog of CTCF and appears to be expressed primarily in the cytoplasm of spermatocytes, unlike CTCF which is expressed primarily in the nucleus of somatic cells. CTCF and CTCFL  are normally expressed in a mutually exclusive pattern that correlates with resetting of methylation marks during male germ cell differentiation.

References

Further reading

External links